France has had a national men's curling championship since 1951.

Sources
Championnat de France messieurs
Nos Champions (web archive)

Curling competitions in France
Curling